Dopamine is a chemical naturally produced in the body.

Dopamine may also refer to:

Science
 Dopamine (medication) a medication used to treat a number of health problems
 Dopamine receptor
 Dopamine transporter

Arts and science
 Dopamine (film), a 2003 film written and directed by Mark Decena
 Dopamine (Third Eye Blind album), a 2015 album by Third Eye Blind
 Dopamine (Børns album), a 2015 album by Børns
 Dopamine (Mila J album), a 2017 album by Mila J
 Dopamine, a 2022 album by British band Thunder
 "Dopamine", a song from the 2005 album Fused by Tony Iommi and Glenn Hughes
 ”Dopamine”, a song from the 2018 album R.O.S.E. by Jessie J
 "Dopamine" (Purple Disco Machine song), 2021

See also 
 Dopamin, an album by the German band Böhse Onkelz
 "Dopamin", an instrumental track from the album Ego by Oomph!